Onyeka Nwelue  (born 31 January 1988) is a Nigerian writer and filmmaker.

Early life
Nwelue's father, Chukwuemeka Samuel Nwelue (1945–2022), was a record-shop and motel owner from Ezeoke Nsu, Imo State, Nigeria who entered local politics and was appointed a chieftain and Knight of St Christopher, having formerly been a cashier and wages supervisor for construction company George Wimpey & Co. Nigeria. His mother, Catherine Ona Nwelue, taught for 35 years in public schools and is a religious scholar and social scientist. His aunt, Professor Leslye Obiora, was Nigeria's former Minister of Mines and Steel. Nwelue has stated that he is the great-great-grandson of Royal court adjudicator Nze Ukwu Nwelue Nnadum.

Nwelue briefly studied sociology and anthropology at the University of Nigeria, Nsukka, but did not take a degree. He subsequently studied for a diploma in scriptwriting at the Asian Academy of Film and TV, Noida. He was later awarded a scholarship to study directing at the Prague Film School in the Czech Republic.

Nwelue left for Lagos when he was 16 years old to attend the Wole Soyinka Festival, after which he was introduced to the Nobel Laureate. Soyinka remains one of Nwelue's fans: "He has read everything I have published," according to Nwelue. Soyinka has also organized private screenings of Nwelue's work.

Career

Writing and film
Early in his career, Nwelue wrote for The Guardian in Nigeria, under Jahman Anikulapo, then-editor of The Guardian on Sunday.

He is the author of, as of 2023, 22 books, twenty of which have been self-published or through his publishing company Abibiman Publishing. He produced nine books in 2021.

Nwelue's second novel, The Beginning of Everything Colourful, was shortlisted for the ANA Prose Fiction Prize in 2018, and his collection of poetry, The Lagos Cuban Jazz Club, was shortlisted for ANA Poetry Prize in the same year.

Nwelue adapted his novella Island of Happiness into an Igbo-language film, Agwaetiti Obiụtọ, which won Best Feature Film by a Director at the 2018 Newark International Film Festival and went on to be nominated for Best First Feature Film by a Director and the Ousmane Sembene Award for Best Film in an African Language at the 2018 Africa Movie Academy Awards. Island of Happiness was inspired by true events in Oguta.

Academia
Nwelue was an unpaid academic visitor at the African Studies Centre at the University of Oxford for the year 2021/22; He founded Oxford-based James Currey Society (unaffiliated with the university) and established the James Currey Fellowship in cooperation with the African Studies Centre. He is founder and director of the James Currey Literary Festival, which took place at Weston Library, University of Oxford. A bust of James Currey was unveiled on 1 September 2022.

Nwelue was also a Visiting Scholar to the Centre of African Studies in the University of Cambridge until both of these unpaid connections were cancelled, due to a number of controversies. These included Nwelue claiming to be a "professor" at Oxford and Cambridge and using Oxford and Cambridge branding and logos to market events with permission. Moreover, students complained that Nwelue had charged £20 for signing a book written by controversial Nigerian author David Hundeyin, made negative social media comments about poor upbringings resulting in people being "stupid", stated that "no poor person has any value", as well as commenting that "African women look like masquerades when they wear wigs and make up". He also made misogynistic and sexist remarks at the talk (for entry to which he charged an additional £20), including saying women "slept their way to the top", "oppressed men", and that marrying women held men back in life.

He was a visiting research fellow at the Center for International Studies, Ohio University.

Other activities
Nwelue is the founder of La Cave Musik, a record label based in Paris, France, and co-founded the UK-based company Abibiman Publishing, through which Nwelue self-publishes his own books.

Bibliography 

The Abyssinian Boy: (DADA Books, 2009)
 Wole Soyinka: Encounters with the Grey Maverick 
 The Beginning of Everything Colourful: (Hattus Books, 2018).
There Are No White People
 An Angel on the Piano (Griots Lounge, 2020)
 Island of Happiness (novella)
 The Real Owners of Britain
 The Lagos Cuban Jazz Club (poetry)
 The Spice Bazaar (play, 2018)
 Lemon Grass (fiction)
 Hip-Hop is Only for Children:
Outside Weston Library (fiction)
 The Strangers of Braamfontein (2021)
The Last Trains out of Ukraine (poetry)
 Burnt:
Evening Coffee with Arundhati Roy (fiction)
 A Country of Extraordinary Ghosts, 
 84 Delicious Bottles of Wine (with Odega Shawa), 
 Saving Mungo Park (with Ikenna Chinedu Okeh, Hattus Books, 2021) (children's novel)

Filmography 

 The House of Nwapa
 Island of Happiness

Controversies 

After being invited to the Man Hong Kong literary festival, Nwelue was denied a visa to Hong Kong, sparking media outcry, the alleged reason being the colour of his skin. The decision was reversed and he got a visa to attend the festival.

In 2017, Nwelue was brutalized by military men for trying to stop them from raping a sex worker. A year later, Nwelue was arrested at the lobby of Onomo Hotel in Kigali and jailed for eight days, for allegedly "publicly insulting" Rwandan president Paul Kagame on Twitter and RwandAir. Nwelue was released after the intervention of former Nigerian President Olusegun Obasanjo. Prior to his arrest, he was a voluntary lecturer at Kwetu Film Institute, founded by the filmmaker Eric Kabera.

In a May 2020 interview, Nobel laureate Wole Soyinka disclosed that some "wannabe Christian Ayatollahs" demonstrated over Nwelue's novel A Country of Extraordinary Ghosts, carrying placards that read: "Death to Nwelue".

Having been an academic visitor at the African Studies Centre at the University of Oxford in 2021/22, a probe into Nwelue's conduct was launched after Oxford students reported he had charged £20 for attendance at a book launch in January 2023. When it was discovered that Nwelue had claimed to be a "professor" at Oxford and Cambridge on social media, a claim Nwelue denies, his visitorship was cancelled. The reason given was "persistent unacceptable breaches of its terms". The fellowship itself, named after James Currey was later reported to have been set up to benefit Nwelue's financial associates.

Nwelue had also been reported for social media posts stating that a poor upbringing "chains you mentally to be stupid" and that "no poor person has any value", as well as commenting "African women look like masquerades when they wear wigs and make up".

In an uncharacteristic defense, Nobel Laureate Wole Soyinka urged restraint, writing, "The ultimate responsibility is however his, and he has emerged upfront to accept this in a letter of apology. Now, it is the turn of the enabling environment to also take stock and clean up its act. ‘Casting the first stone’ is easy enough; ensuring that the baby is not thrown out with the bathwater is the harder, and far more productive responsibility. The literary world can do with more babies from the bassinet of The Strangers of Braamfontein!"

Personal life
Nwelue identifies as a feminist; in an interview, after making The House of Nwapa, he said: "I made The House of Nwapa, because I am a feminist. I believe we are all equal."

On 1 February 2018, a day after his 30th birthday, Onyeka was involved in a car accident, sustaining injuries to his lower back. He was confined to a wheelchair for two months, before using a walking aid.

Notable awards
 Recipient, Institute for Research in Women, Children and Culture (IRAWCC) Grant
 Recipient, Princ Claus Ticket Grant 2013
 Honorary Doctor of Humane Letters, Universite Queensland 2019.
 ANA Prize for Fiction 2021
 Best Indie Novel Winner- The Crime Fiction Lover Awards 2021

See also
 List of Nigerian film producers

References

External links

 Official website

1988 births
21st-century Nigerian poets
21st-century Nigerian writers
Harvard University alumni
Igbo academics
Igbo people
Igbo poets
Living people
Nigerian academics
Nigerian editors
Nigerian filmmakers
Nigerian male poets
Nigerian male writers
Nigerian publishers (people)
Nigerian television talk show hosts
Nigerian writers
Ohio University people
People from Imo State
University of Nigeria alumni